The Tz'enah Ur'enah ( Ṣʼenā urʼenā "Go forth and see"), also spelt Tsene-rene and Tzeno Ureno, sometimes called the Women's Bible, is a Yiddish-language prose work of c.1590s whose structure parallels the weekly Torah portions and Haftarahs used in Jewish prayer services. The book was written by Jacob ben Isaac Ashkenazi (1550–1625) of Janów Lubelski  (near Lublin, Poland), and mixes Biblical passages with teachings from Judaism's Oral Torah such as the Talmud's Aggadah and Midrash, which are sometimes called "parables, allegories, short stories, anecdotes, legends, and admonitions" by secular writers.

The name derives from a verse of the Song of Songs that begins  ("Go forth and see, O ye daughters of Zion",). The name indicates that the book was particularly directed at women, who would have been worse versed in Hebrew, although the title page markets it to men and women equally. The title page of the 1622 Hanau(?) edition acknowledged among the book's sources various Talmudic texts and Biblical commentaries, including those of Rashi, Nachmanides, Hezekiah ben Manoah, Abraham Saba, Isaac Karo, and Bahya ben Asher.

Sol Liptzin describes the Tseno Ureno as "a fascinating, didactic book which could win the approbation of the strict moral leaders of Eastern European Jewry, and at the same time accompany women as their favorite literary and devotional text from girlhood to old age. For generations there was hardly a Yiddish home that did not possess a copy." Yisrael Meir Kagan wrote of earlier generations reading the book "Tzenah urenah" each Sabbath.

Because of its orientation toward women readers, the book is particularly focused on the biblical matriarchs, the various courtships mentioned in scripture, and the rescue of Moses by Pharaoh's daughter. Although there are vivid depictions of Paradise and Hell, there is an emphasis that righteousness is to be found in serving God willingly and wholeheartedly, rather than out of hope of reward or fear of punishment. Charity and almsgiving are also emphasized.

Editions and translation

There have been at least 300 editions of the book, starting in the 1590s. According to the 1622 edition, there were three previous editions - one printed in Lublin and two in Kraków - but they were already rare, and no copy of any of them has survived.

Parts of Tseno Ureno were translated into German in 1910 by Bertha Pappenheim as Zennah u-Reenah. Only the first part of her translation of the Women's Bible appeared (Bereschit, corresponding to the Book of Genesis). The translations of the second and third books (Schemot and Wajikra) have apparently been lost.

Morris M. Faierstein published a first critical translation into English in 2017.

The book continues in print today, especially for Hasidic communities. ArtScroll published a two-volume English translation in 1993, under the title The Weekly Midrash: Tz'enah Ur'enah the Classic Anthology of Torah Lore and Midrashic Commentary.

See also
 Bible translations into German  
 Yiddish
 Yiddish literature

References

External links
 Tseno Ureno printed in Sulzbach, 1798
 Blitz, Avi. “The Tsene-rene: In Search of a Seventeenth-Century Yiddish Bible in Modern-Day Jerusalem.” In geveb, May 2019.

Further reading
Norman C. Gore: Tzeenah u-reenah − a Jewish commentary on the Book of Exodus. Vantage Press, New York 1965

History of the Hebrew Bible
Aggadic Midrashim
Yiddish
Judaism and women
Jewish literature
Yiddish-language literature
1590s books